The Nandi Resistance was a military conflict that took place in present-day Kenya between 1890 and 1906. It involved members of the Kalenjin ethnic group, mainly from the Nandi section, and the British colonial administration. The close of the 19th century, a time referred to as the "pacification period" by Matson, saw a number of local populations that resisted British colonial rule. Of these, the Nandi resistance would stand out for being the longest and most tenacious.

The Nandi resistance was led by Koitalel Arap Samoei, the Orkoiyot of the Nandi at the time. On 19 October 1905, on the grounds of what is now Nandi Bears Club, Arap Samoei was asked to meet Col Richard Meinertzhagen for a truce. However, Meinertzhagen and his men killed Koitalel Arap Samoei and his entourage, ending the resistance.

Background
In the later decades of the 19th century, at the time when the early European explorers started advancing into the interior of Kenya, Nandi territory was a closed country. Thompson in 1883 was warned to avoid the country of the Nandi, who were known for attacks on strangers and caravans that would attempt to scale the great massif of the Mau.

Nandi suspicion was not without cause. Like many other indigenous cultures, Kalenjin prophets foretold the coming of the white man and among the Nandi, Mongo and the Orkoiyot Kimnyole's prophesies were the most notable examples. Mongo was more detailed in his account, foretelling the arrival of the white people and warning against fighting them for they were powerful. Kimnyole, before his execution only predicted that the confrontation would have a significant impact on the Nandi. Fresh with their victories against their neighboring tribes and the Arabs however, the Nandi believed that they would succeed in protecting their homelands.

Seven years after Thompson's foray, only three small European caravans including his, had entered Nandi but no significant contact had been made. The only solid information was gathered from the Maasai who Hannington related regarded the Nandi tribe "to be the most difficult to deal with for its fighting powers".

Cause
Matson, in his account of the resistance, shows "how the irresponsible actions of two British traders, Andrew Dick and Peter West, quickly upset the precarious modus vivendi between the Nandi and incoming British". This would lead to more than a decade of conflict.

The war began in an unlikely fashion. West, an alleged gun-runner who has been described in historical literature as a "continual drunk", arrived at Mumias on 20 March 1895 and soon got into partnership with Dick, a "choleric" trader who had set up trading posts from the coast to Lake Victoria. Their intention was to independently establish domination and a trade monopoly with the Nandi.

Their escapade, which they began on 23 June 1895 by organizing two caravans, started off poorly. Dick had three rifles taken by the Kilekwa while one of West's men was murdered. Dick had two Nandi warriors who had surrendered whipped and later bound and drowned. A Nandi reconnaissance party was also fired upon by Dick and dispersed after losing one warrior.

While Dick was busy antagonizing the Nandi, West had pitched his camp two hours from the nearest Nandi houses and from here he unsuccessfully attempted to negotiate for ivory that he sought upon his first contact with the Nandi. Although warned of the Nandi, West persisted in his attempts to negotiate by treating the Nandi delegates well. His efforts were repaid at 2:00AM on the morning of 16 July 1895 when the camp was rushed by Nandi warriors and all but eight of the expedition were killed without a shot being fired. West's last words were reported as, "Give me my gun."

Military operations

The East Africa Protectorate, Foreign Office, and missionary societies administrations reacted to West's death by organizing military expeditions against the Nand in 1895 and 1897. The first expedition in 1895 consisted of 400 askari soldiers led by European officers and armed with rifles and a Maxim machine gun. The second expedition in 1897 included 500 askari soldiers with the same armaments as before. These expeditions were able to inflict sporadic losses upon Nandi warriors, burning several Nandi villages and capturing of hundreds of livestock, but proved unable to fully suppress Nandi resistance.

1900 - Third invasion

Background
For the Nandi, the closing decade of the nineteenth century opened with the execution of Kimnyole on a variety of charges followed by a struggle for power between his sons. The Orkoinotet had by now gained prominence as an institution and this struggle for power split the society into factions, and conflict broke out though did not extend to full-fledge civil war. This period also saw a deepening of the 1890s epizootics crisis and the wider mutai it had generated.

British accounts of the invasion note that the two previous expeditions against the Nandi had been unable to bring about Nandi recognition of the establishment of British colonial rule that was then coming in force. They note that raids on the Uasin Gishu Maasai and their nearby tribes were frequent, and that mail runners and isolated stragglers from caravans were still attacked and murdered. Several askaris of the Ugandan Rifles are noted to have been killed and their rifles taken. The British perception then as captured by, C.W. Hobley the sub-commissioner of the district was that "The Wanandi, with the exception of a few in the vicinity of the station, have all along viewed our presence in the country with veiled repugnance...we were unwittingly living on the edge of a volcano.".

In late 1899, Colonel Coles carried out brief retaliatory measures and took a number of sheep and goats. Reports indicate that as works continued on the railway line, thefts of ironwork, telegraph wire and stores of all descriptions from unguarded construction camps increased. The area most affected is said to have been in the Nyando Valley, between Molo and Kisumu. 

It is noted that a telegraph wire was cut in March 1900 and that in May, a telegraph office located at a place known as Kitoto's was raided. Further, Nandi warriors are recorded to have made a number of attacks on bridge-building parties, on caravans and on Protectorate military patrols. The sub-commissioner subsequently appealed for more troops.

Preparations
At the time, Nandi was garrisoned by the Protectorates Nos. 7 and 14 companies. They were joined on 3 July 1900 by a company of the Indian contingent and No. 13 Company Uganda Rifles who arrived at Kisumu. Evatt entered Nandi with his troops on 5 July and they were joined by other divisions as the scale of operations grew.
 
 14 August No.15 Company from Lumbwa
 23 August; about 300 Maasai auxiliaries
 25 September; half of No.10 Company from Fort Portal
 13 October; half No.4 Company from Masindi
 17 October; half No. 3 Company from Buddu

It is presently unknown what the Nandi order if any was.

Conflict
The Nandi pursued asymmetric warfare, keeping away from direct conflict while killing isolated parties and stragglers.

It is reported that the conflict began almost as soon as Evatt entered Nandi. His porters are recorded to have been attacked while watering at a stream and that on 7 July, five askaris from Bushiri post were killed while escorting mail.

Further encounters are recorded in early August when an escort party of 20 Sudanese was annihilated while accompanying the dawn mail to Fort Ternan. At the time, this was a new military post that had been established by Coles in 1898.

After Maasai auxiliaries joined his camp, Evatt adopted a plan of concentrating a column at Nandi fort or some other central camp while carrying out cattle raids of two or three days duration. During September, the wooded hills and valleys of Nandi county were traversed from east to west in a series of raids by small mobile columns of about 40 rifles, assisted by 100 spear-men who acted as a screen and often surprised the Nandi by their skillful approach.

By late September 1900, five officers and 296 men had become available as escorts for the British forces. Evatt received news of the whereabouts of Kipeles and Koitalel, the two Nandi leaders primarily responsible for the resistance and decided to attack before they could escape. 

On the night of 12 October, two columns left the camp. The first under Colour-Sergent James Ellison, R.M.L.I marched east over the Nyando river, attacked a 'boma' (i.e ñganaset) early the following day, inflicted severe losses on the Nandi and returned to camp before nightfall.

At 4 a.m on 13 October, the second column, commanded by Evatt, surrounded and captured Kipeles 'boma' killing six Nandi. At 1 p.m that day, he camped with his captures; 700-800 cattle and about 3,000 sheep and goats. According to some reports, his troops were tired and did not complete their boma, other reports note that there was not enough bush available to do so. 

About 9:30 p.m. on 13 October, on making his rounds Evatt is noted to have ordered all camp fires to be extinguished. Shortly afterwards one of these smoldering campfires was suddenly blown into a blaze, and simultaneously Nandi warriors attacked the camp in three parties. The British brought a Maxim gun into action, dispersing the Nandi who managed to recover half of the captured cattle. The operation led to losses of ten askaris, one officer and eighteen wounded on the British side.

Outcome
The operations of the two columns cost the Nandi 74 men killed, 1,039 head of cattle and 3,100 sheep and goats. The total casualties of the operations, including police and auxiliaries, were 103 killed, four died of wounds and 111 wounded of whom 44 killed and 38 wounded came from the military forces engaged.

Reaction
The British Foreign Office, expressed criticism on the ground that some regular forces in the Nandi area had been replaced by Maasai irregulars.

End of Conflict
On 19 October 1905, on the grounds of what is now Nandi Bears Club, Arap Samoei was asked to meet Col Richard Meinertzhagen for a truce. Instead, Meinertzhagen killed Koitalel and his entourage was killed by an armed party which had accompanied Meinertzhagen. Sosten Saina, grand-nephew of one of Arap Samoei's bodyguards notes that "There were about 22 of them who went for a meeting with the ‘mzungu’ that day. Koitalel Arap Samoei had been advised not to shake hands because if he did, that would give him away as the leader. But he extended his hand and was shot immediately".

See also 
List of rulers of the Nandi
Koitalel Arap Samoei

References

1890s in Kenya
1900s in Kenya
Kalenjin
Rebel groups in Kenya
Military operations involving Kenya